Era Of Diversion is the first studio album by American drum and bass trio Evol Intent.

Track listing
 The Foreword feat. J Messinian (2:32)
 Era Of Diversion (4:18)
 The Curtain Falls feat. The Sound Of Animals Fighting (4:39)
 South London (3:18)
 Death, Lies & Videotape feat. Cypher Linguistics (3:23)
 Odd Number feat. Ewun & Vicious Circle (4:39)
 Awkward Rhythm Of The Dance (1:29)
 8-Bit Bitch feat. Ewun (Spor Remix) (4:09)
 I'm Happy Your Grave Is Next To Mine (5:50)
 5:30 PM (2:44)
 Reality Check feat. Ewun (3:51)
 Smoke & Mirrors feat. Aaron Bedard (4:01)
 Mutiny (4:05)
 Double Glock (1:04)
 Dead On Arrival (4:01)
 Gunpowder Plot (3:02)
 Middle Of The Night (5:16)
 The Oscine's Lament (4:15)
 Maybe We'll Dance Tomorrow (4:21)

Personnel
Producer – Evol Intent
Written by A. Jones, M. Diasio, N. Weiller

References

External links
 Evol Intent store

2008 debut albums
Evol Intent albums